Christelle Lechevalier (born 27 September 1968) is a French National Front Member of the European Parliament for North-West France. She replaced Marine Le Pen in the European Parliament on 19 June 2017 following Le Pen's election to the National Assembly.

References

1968 births
Living people
People from Falaise, Calvados
MEPs for North-West France 2014–2019
National Rally (France) MEPs